Heidi Van De Vijver (born 31 December 1969) is a Belgian former racing cyclist, who currently works as a directeur sportif for UCI Women's Continental Team . She won the Belgian national road race title in 1994 and 1998. She also competed at the 1996 and 2000 Summer Olympics.

She was second in the 1992 Tour of the EEC Women and then won the race in 1993.

References

External links
 

1969 births
Living people
Belgian female cyclists
People from Bornem
Olympic cyclists of Belgium
Cyclists at the 1996 Summer Olympics
Cyclists at the 2000 Summer Olympics
Cyclists from Antwerp Province